"Just Keep Me Moving" is a song by Canadian singer-songwriter k.d. lang, co-written with Ben Mink. It was featured in the 1993 film Even Cowgirls Get the Blues, starring Uma Thurman, as well as the soundtrack album. The single was released in November 1993, and reached number six on the US Billboard Hot Dance Club Play chart and number seven on the Canadian RPM Adult Contemporary chart. In Europe, it peaked at number 59 on the UK Singles Chart, but was more successful on the UK Dance Singles Chart, peaking at number 35. A music video was produced to promote the single.

Critical reception
Larry Flick from Billboard commented, "Betcha thought it would never happen. Torch diva lang slips into an intense deep-house groove with a lot more ease than you might expect. Redressing of a disco-minded cut from the Even Cowgirls Get the Blues soundtrack is an essential peak-hour entry, thanks to hearty bottom and moody keyboards. Radio may dig the equally jammin' hip-hop remixes. Gag on it, kiddies." Ben Thompson from The Independent wrote, "Her swooning and, well, langorous vocal performances on songs such as "Lifted by Love" and "Just Keep Me Moving" are the perfect complement to the film's mood of dreamy sensuality, and also stand up well on their own." 

A reviewer of Music & Media remarked, "This funky single [...] is a gigantic departure from her usual "torch and twang". Funky as hell, it should give dance divas the blues." Sam Wood from Philadelphia Inquirer found that "she imbues the antiquated sound of a '70s bell-bottom thumper with genuine heart, as if she were getting her first big break headlining at the Love Boats discotheque." Renée Christ from Spin described it as "a dancey patter track, with lang's vocals filling space like a Casio sample when she's singing the repetitive onomatopoetic lyrics."

Track listings

 7-inch single, Europe (1993)
 "Just Keep Me Moving" (Radio Remix) — 4:08
 "In Perfect Dreams" — 3:07

 12-inch single, US (1993)
 "Just Keep Me Moving" (Movin' Mix) — 6:41
 "Just Keep Me Moving" (Movin' Dub) — 6:40
 "Just Keep Me Moving" (Radio Remix) — 4:10
 "Just Keep Me Moving" (Wild Planet Mix) — 6:15
 "Just Keep Me Moving" (Wild Planet Instrumental) — 6:19
 "In Perfect Dreams" (Album Version) — 3:09

 CD single, Europe (1993)
 "Just Keep Me Moving" (Radio Remix) — 4:08
 "Just Keep Me Moving" (Movin' Mix) — 6:40
 "Just Keep Me Moving" (Wild Planet Mix) — 6:15
 "Just Keep Me Moving" (Movin' Dub) — 6:41
 "Just Keep Me Moving" (Wild Planet Instrumental) — 6:15
 "Just Keep Me Moving" (Album Version) — 4:42

 CD maxi, US (1993)
 "Just Keep Me Moving" (Remix/Album Version) — 3:58
 "Just Keep Me Moving" (Radio Remix) — 4:10
 "Just Keep Me Moving" (Movin' Mix) — 6:41
 "In Perfect Dreams" (Album Version) — 3:09
 "Just Keep Me Moving" (Wild Planet Mix) — 6:15

Charts

References

1993 singles
1993 songs
Deep house songs
K.d. lang songs
Songs written by Ben Mink
Songs written by k.d. lang
Songs written for films